Bar-X is an amusement with prize (AWP) model of slot machine created in 1981 by Electrocoin, a company founded in 1976.

The idea behind its creation was to create a machine that was easily operable, delivered a good "hit" frequency, and allowed the player to feel that they were in control. The first rough concept was named OXO.

In 1982, it went into full production with the Japanese gaming company Universal Entertainment Corporation. The first versions were produced in Japan and the game appeared under the OXO Americana Cabinet brand name, and Super OXO in a casino style cabinet.

Electrocoin produced an initial run of one-hundred Bar-X machines at their factory in Ferry Road, Cardiff, Wales. These units had a newer style of payout technology and a redesigned cabinet.

By 1983, Bar-X had become established as "an essential part of the furniture" in UK amusement arcades. That same year Big 7 was added to the range, since then the Bar-X family has been a permanent fixture in almost every major gaming outlet across the UK. Several top gaming industry figures have described it as the best machine of all time, and a "benchmark for many AWPs on the market".

As a result of the increase in production, in 1989 Electrocoin moved to larger premises in Cardiff and divided the business into two component parts - namely Electrocoin Aftersales and Service Ltd to manage demand and service and support which remains based in Cardiff and Electrocoin Sales Ltd to manage production and sales which is now based in Wembley, North London.

By early 1993, sales of Bar-X had passed the 20,000 mark.

Today Electrocoin, largely under the Bar-X brand, continues to produce new machines and electronic games.

Coinciding with its 35th anniversary in 2016, it released the Bar-X Deluxe app for the iPhone and iPad to appeal to a new generation of players whilst retaining its classic format.

A second mobile app, Bar-X Card Crazy is the latest addition to its mobile range, offering what it clams is "the most comprehensive and genuine fruit-machine gameplay experience on a mobile".

References

External links
Bar-X
Electrocoin
Bar-X YouTube channel

Slot machines